Arthur Dobson may refer to:
Sir Arthur Dudley Dobson (1841–1934), surveyor best known for discovering Arthur's Pass in 1864
Arthur Dobson (cricketer) (1854–1932), English cricketer
Arthur Dobson (footballer) (1893–1918), English footballer